Espinho is a city and a municipality located in the Aveiro District, Portugal. It is located in both the Greater Porto and the Metropolitan Area of Porto, 16 km from its city centre. It is one of the smallest municipalities in Portugal and was, until 1899, part of the Santa Maria da Feira Municipality.

In 2021, Espinho had a population of 31,027, a slight decrease from the previous census in 2011, when 31,786 were registered, in an area of 21.06 km².

The current Mayor is Miguel Reis, elected by the PS.

It is a beach resort and a zone of legal gambling with a casino - Casino Solverde.  Its fair - Feira de Espinho, having been first organised in 1894, is well known in Portugal. The city is home to CINANIMA - Festival Internacional de Cinema de Animação, an international animation festival, and FEST - New Directors New Films Festival, an international film festival. The municipal holiday is June 16.

Sports 

Volleyball

The city, known as the volleyball capital in Portugal, is the home of nine Portuguese sports clubs: Novasemente/Cavalinho, Sporting Clube de Silvalde, Associação Desportiva de Anta, Clube de Voleibol de Espinho, Sporting Clube de Espinho, Associação Académica de Espinho, Academia de Ténis de Espinho, Clube de Ténis de Espinho and Associação Desportiva Rio Largo.

Sporting Clube de Espinho and Associação Académica de Espinho are regular presences in the Portuguese Volleyball First Division. The first one is the Portuguese team with more titles (including a CEV Cup, formerly known as CEV Top Teams Cup) and the second one was once national champion.

Football

Sporting Clube de Espinho (Os Tigres da Costa Verde) plays in Campeonato Nacional de Seniores, the third football championship in Portugal.

Former Portugal national football team player Fernando Couto, Olympiacos coach Vítor Pereira, the olympic medalist António Leitão and volleyball players, such as Miguel Maia and João Brenha, were born in Espinho.

Beach Volleyball

The city hosted the 2017 FIVB Beach Volleyball World Tour, between the 28th and 30 July. Espinho also hosted the FIVB Beach Volleyball World Tour in 2019, between the 16th and 21 July.

Beach Soccer

The city hosted the 2015 FIFA Beach Soccer World Cup, between the 9th and 19 July.

Surf

Surf event Espinho Surf Destination is an annual event held in Espinho, organized by the World Surf League.

Golf

The oldest golf club in Portugal and Spain, Oporto Golf Club, is also located in Espinho.

Gallery

Demographics

Espinho is also home to a significant Madeiran immigrant community.

Parishes 
Administratively, the municipality is divided into 4 civil parishes (freguesias):
 Anta e Guetim
 Espinho
 Paramos
 Silvalde

Cities and towns
 Espinho (city)
 Silvalde (town)
 Anta (town)
 Paramos (town)
 Guetim (town)
 Esmojães (town)

Notable people

Politics
Carlos Guimarães Pinto (born in Espinho, Portugal, in 1983), a Portuguese economist, author, university professor, think tank executive, blogger and politician. A prominent member of the Liberal Initiative party.

Sport

 António Jesus (1955–2010), known as Jesus, was a football goalkeeper with 383 club caps and 7 for Portugal
 António Leitão (1960–2012) a Portuguese long distance athlete; bronze medallist in the men's 5000 metres at the 1984 Summer Olympics
 Jaime Alves (1965–2020), known as Alves, was a Portuguese footballer with 271 club caps and 3 for Portugal
 Fernando Couto (born 1969) a Portuguese former footballer with 438 club caps and 110 for Portugal
 Filipe Gonçalves (born 1984) a Portuguese footballer with over 420 club caps 
 João Carlos Dias Correia (born 1985) known as Carlitos, is a Portuguese footballer with almost 400 club caps
 Fábio Espinho (born 1985) known as Espinho, is a Portuguese footballer with over 400 club caps

References

External links 
 
 
 
 
 
 
 Photos from Espinho
 Espinho City Official Website

 
Municipalities of Aveiro District